Donna Hoffman is the Louis Rosenfeld Distinguished Scholar and Professor of Marketing at the School of Business at The George Washington University. She is the co-founder of eLab, an online laboratory for consumer behavior research and the Co-Director of the Center for the Connected Consumer.

Academic career 
Hoffman has a B.A degree from the University of California at Davis, and an M.A. and Ph.D. from the L. L. Thurstone Psychometric Laboratory at the University of North Carolina at Chapel Hill.

Research 
Her award-winning research focuses on online consumer behavior, Internet marketing strategy, and consumer perceptions and implications of emerging technology including the IoT and AI. She has published widely in the top marketing and management journals and speaks frequently on the topic of online marketing strategy. Hoffman was awarded the prestigious William O'Dell Award for long-term research impact and is the recipient of the Sheth Foundation/Journal of Marketing Award for her long-term contributions to the marketing discipline.

Prior to her appointment at The George Washington University, Hoffman was the Chancellor's Chair at the University of California, Riverside, and also served on the faculty at Columbia University, University of Texas at Dallas, and Vanderbilt University.  At Vanderbilt, Hoffman launched the first graduate business program in electronic commerce in the country and, together with Tom Novak created the first iteration of eLab. They also co-founded the Sloan Center for Internet Retailing, one of the Alfred P. Sloan's Industry Centers.

External links
 Alfred P. Sloan's Industry Centers
 eLab
 Join the Connected Consumer Panel
 eLab eXchange
 A. Gary Anderson Graduate School of Management
 University of California, Riverside
 Center for the Connected Consumer

George Washington University faculty
University of California, Davis alumni
University of North Carolina at Chapel Hill alumni
Living people
American business theorists
Year of birth missing (living people)